The 2017–18 Philadelphia Flyers season was the 51st season for the National Hockey League franchise that was established on June 5, 1967. They would improve from their record from last year and make the playoffs for the first time since the 2015–16 season.

Off-season

The first major event of the off-season was the 2017 NHL Expansion Draft with general manager Ron Hextall having to submit his list of protected players for the draft. The Vegas Golden Knights selected Pierre-Edouard Bellemare at number 12 from the Flyers.

Having been awarded the second overall pick in the 2017 NHL Entry Draft in the draft lottery, Hextall made several trades in the lead-up to draft day. The most significant of them being to trade Brayden Schenn to the St. Louis Blues in exchange for the 27th overall pick in the draft, a conditional first round pick in 2018, and Jori Lehtera. The Flyers selected forward Nolan Patrick with the second overall pick, and went on to add Morgan Frost with the pick acquired from St. Louis and Isaac Ratcliffe with their second round selection, to add to their forward prospects.

The Flyers remained fairly quiet players in free agency, as had been the case the previous year. The main issue for Hextall being to decide how to fill the vacancy left in net by Steve Mason. On July 1, 2017 the Flyers announced the signing of free agent Brian Elliott who would join the recently extended Michal Neuvirth to make up the goalie tandem. The Flyers also re-signed several players including Scott Laughton, Taylor Leier, Jordan Weal and Shayne Gostisbehere.

Standings

Schedule and results

Preseason
The preseason schedule was published on June 15, 2017.

|- style="background:#ffc;"
| 1 || September 17 || Philadelphia || 2–3 || NY Islanders || OT || Lyon || – || 0–0–1 || 
|- style="background:#cfc;"
| 2 || September 20 || NY Islanders || 2–3 || Philadelphia || OT || Irving || – || 1–0–1 || 
|- style="background:#fcc;"
| 3 || September 20 || Philadelphia || 2–3 || NY Islanders || || Lyon || 5,042 || 1–1–1 || 
|- style="background:#ffc;"
| 4 || September 21 || Philadelphia || 1–2 || Boston || OT || Lyon || 16,781 || 1–1–2 || 
|- style="background:#ffc;"
| 5 || September 25 || Philadelphia || 2–3 || NY Rangers || OT || Neuvirth || 14,037 || 1–1–3 || 
|- style="background:#cfc;"
| 6 || September 26 || NY Rangers || 3–4 || Philadelphia || OT || Elliott || 18,266 || 2–1–3 || 
|- style="background:#cfc;"
| 7 || September 28 || Boston || 1–5 || Philadelphia || || Lyon || 18,572 || 3–1–3 || 
|- style="background:#fcc;"
| 8 || October 1 || NY Islanders || 5–2 || Philadelphia || || Elliott || 18,575 || 3–2–3 || 
|-
| colspan="10" style="text-align:center;"|
Notes:
 – Indicates split-squad game.
 – Game was played at Nassau Veterans Memorial Coliseum in Uniondale, New York.
 – Game was played at PPL Center in Allentown, Pennsylvania.
|-

|-
| Legend:

Regular season
The regular season schedule was released on June 22, 2017.

|- style="background:#cfc;"
| 1 || October 4 || Philadelphia || 5–3 || San Jose || || Elliott || 17,562 || 1–0–0 || 2 || 
|- style="background:#fcc;"
| 2 || October 5 || Philadelphia || 0–2 || Los Angeles || || Neuvirth || 18,230 || 1–1–0 || 2 || 
|- style="background:#cfc;"
| 3 || October 7 || Philadelphia || 3–2 || Anaheim || OT || Elliott || 16,032 || 2–1–0 || 4 || 
|- style="background:#fcc;"
| 4 || October 10 || Philadelphia || 5–6 || Nashville || || Elliott || 17,194 || 2–2–0 || 4 || 
|- style="background:#cfc;"
| 5 || October 14 || Washington || 2–8 || Philadelphia || || Elliott || 19,817 || 3–2–0 || 6 || 
|- style="background:#cfc;"
| 6 || October 17 || Florida || 1–5 || Philadelphia || || Neuvirth || 19,145 || 4–2–0 || 8 || 
|- style="background:#fcc;"
| 7 || October 19 || Nashville || 1–0 || Philadelphia || || Neuvirth || 19,396 || 4–3–0 || 8 || 
|- style="background:#cfc;"
| 8 || October 21 || Edmonton || 1–2 || Philadelphia || || Elliott || 19,510 || 5–3–0 || 10 || 
|- style="background:#fcc;"
| 9 || October 24 || Anaheim || 6–2 || Philadelphia || || Elliott || 18,895 || 5–4–0 || 10 || 
|- style="background:#fcc;"
| 10 || October 26 || Philadelphia || 4–5 || Ottawa || || Neuvirth || 14,926 || 5–5–0 || 10 || 
|- style="background:#cfc;"
| 11 || October 28 || Philadelphia || 4–2 || Toronto || || Elliott || 19,317 || 6–5–0 || 12 || 
|- style="background:#ffc;"
| 12 || October 30 || Arizona || 4–3 || Philadelphia || OT || Elliott || 18,731 || 6–5–1 || 13 || 
|-

|- style="background:#fcc;"
| 13 || November 1 || Philadelphia || 0–3 || Chicago || || Elliott || 21,524 || 6–6–1 || 13 || 
|- style="background:#cfc;"
| 14 || November 2 || Philadelphia || 2–0 || St. Louis || || Neuvirth || 17,162 || 7–6–1 || 15 || 
|- style="background:#ffc;"
| 15 || November 4 || Colorado || 5–4 || Philadelphia || SO || Neuvirth || 19,616 || 7–6–2 || 16 || 
|- style="background:#cfc;"
| 16 || November 9 || Chicago || 1–3 || Philadelphia || || Elliott || 19,738 || 8–6–2 || 18 || 
|- style="background:#fcc;"
| 17 || November 11 || Minnesota || 1–0 || Philadelphia || || Elliott || 19,309 || 8–7–2 || 18 || 
|- style="background:#fcc;"
| 18 || November 14 || Philadelphia || 0–3 || Minnesota || || Elliott || 18,768 || 8–8–2 || 18 || 
|- style="background:#ffc;"
| 19 || November 16 || Philadelphia || 2–3 || Winnipeg || SO || Elliott || 15,321 || 8–8–3 || 19 || 
|- style="background:#ffc;"
| 20 || November 18 || Calgary || 5–4 || Philadelphia || OT || Elliott || 19,210 || 8–8–4 || 20 || 
|- style="background:#fcc;"
| 21 || November 21 || Vancouver || 5–2 || Philadelphia || || Neuvirth || 19,278 || 8–9–4 || 20 || 
|- style="background:#ffc;"
| 22 || November 22 || Philadelphia || 3–4 || NY Islanders || OT || Elliott || 12,462 || 8–9–5 || 21 || 
|- style="background:#ffc;"
| 23 || November 24 || NY Islanders || 5–4 || Philadelphia || OT || Elliott || 19,643 || 8–9–6 || 22 || 
|- style="background:#ffc;"
| 24 || November 27 || Philadelphia || 4–5 || Pittsburgh || OT || Elliott || 18,505 || 8–9–7 || 23 || 
|- style="background:#fcc;"
| 25 || November 28 || San Jose || 3–1 || Philadelphia || || Neuvirth || 18,935 || 8–10–7 || 23 || 
|-

|- style="background:#fcc;"
| 26 || December 2 || Boston || 3–0 || Philadelphia || || Elliott || 19,274 || 8–11–7 || 23 || 
|- style="background:#cfc;"
| 27 || December 4 || Philadelphia || 5–2 || Calgary || || Elliott || 18,590 || 9–11–7 || 25 || 
|- style="background:#cfc;"
| 28 || December 6 || Philadelphia || 4–2 || Edmonton || || Elliott || 18,347 || 10–11–7 || 27 || 
|- style="background:#cfc;"
| 29 || December 7 || Philadelphia || 4–1 || Vancouver || || Elliott || 16,515 || 11–11–7 || 29 || 
|- style="background:#cfc;"
| 30 || December 12 || Toronto || 2–4 || Philadelphia || || Elliott || 19,077 || 12–11–7 || 31 || 
|- style="background:#cfc;"
| 31 || December 14 || Buffalo || 1–2 || Philadelphia || || Elliott || 19,508 || 13–11–7 || 33 || 
|- style="background:#cfc;"
| 32 || December 16 || Dallas || 1–2 || Philadelphia || OT || Elliott || 19,477 || 14–11–7 || 35 || 
|- style="background:#fcc;"
| 33 || December 18 || Los Angeles || 4–1 || Philadelphia || || Elliott || 19,617 || 14–12–7 || 35 || 
|- style="background:#cfc;"
| 34 || December 20 || Detroit || 3–4 || Philadelphia || || Elliott || 19,674 || 15–12–7 || 37 || 
|- style="background:#fcc;"
| 35 || December 22 || Philadelphia || 2–4 || Buffalo || || Elliott || 18,222 || 15–13–7 || 37 || 
|- style="background:#ffc;"
| 36 || December 23 || Philadelphia || 1–2 || Columbus || SO || Elliott || 17,812 || 15–13–8 || 38 || 
|- style="background:#fcc;"
| 37 || December 28 || Philadelphia || 2–3 || Florida || || Elliott || 17,083 || 15–14–8 || 38 || 
|- style="background:#cfc;"
| 38 || December 29 || Philadelphia || 5–3 || Tampa Bay || || Elliott || 19,092 || 16–14–8 || 40 || 
|-

|- style="background:#fcc;"
| 39 || January 2 || Pittsburgh || 5–1 || Philadelphia || || Elliott || 19,558 || 16–15–8 || 40 || 
|- style="background:#cfc;"
| 40 || January 4 || NY Islanders || 4–6 || Philadelphia || || Elliott || 19,358 || 17–15–8 || 42 || 
|- style="background:#cfc;"
| 41 || January 6 || St. Louis || 3–6 || Philadelphia || || Elliott || 19,665 || 18–15–8 || 44 || 
|- style="background:#cfc;"
| 42 || January 7 || Buffalo || 1–4 || Philadelphia || || Neuvirth || 19,662 || 19–15–8 || 46 || 
|- style="background:#cfc;"
| 43 || January 13 || Philadelphia || 5–3 || New Jersey || || Elliott || 16,514 || 20–15–8 || 48 || 
|- style="background:#fcc;"
| 44 || January 16 || Philadelphia || 1–5 || NY Rangers || || Elliott || 18,006 || 20–16–8 || 48 || 
|- style="background:#cfc;"
| 45 || January 18 || Toronto || 2–3 || Philadelphia || OT || Neuvirth || 19,860 || 21–16–8 || 50 || 
|- style="background:#cfc;"
| 46 || January 20 || New Jersey || 1–3 || Philadelphia || || Neuvirth || 19,934 || 22–16–8 || 52 || 
|- style="background:#cfc;"
| 47 || January 21 || Philadelphia || 2–1 || Washington || OT || Elliott || 18,506 || 23–16–8 || 54 || 
|- style="background:#cfc;"
| 48 || January 23 || Philadelphia || 3–2 || Detroit || OT || Elliott || 19,515 || 24–16–8 || 56 || 
|- style="background:#fcc;"
| 49 || January 25 || Tampa Bay || 5–1 || Philadelphia || || Neuvirth || 19,489 || 24–17–8 || 56 || 
|- style="background:#fcc;"
| 50 || January 31 || Philadelphia || 3–5 || Washington || || Neuvirth || 18,506 || 24–18–8 || 56 || 
|-

|- style="background:#fcc;"
| 51 || February 1 || Philadelphia || 3–4 || New Jersey || || Lyon || 13,906 || 24–19–8 || 56 || 
|- style="background:#ffc;"
| 52 || February 3 || Ottawa || 4–3 || Philadelphia || SO || Neuvirth || 19,729 || 24–19–9 || 57 || 
|- style="background:#cfc;"
| 53 || February 6 || Philadelphia || 2–1 || Carolina || OT || Elliott || 11,585 || 25–19–9 || 59 || 
|- style="background:#cfc;"
| 54 || February 8 || Montreal || 3–5 || Philadelphia || || Elliott || 19,655 || 26–19–9 || 61 || 
|- style="background:#cfc;"
| 55 || February 10 || Philadelphia || 4–3 || Arizona || SO || Neuvirth || 13,004 || 27–19–9 || 63 || 
|- style="background:#cfc;"
| 56 || February 11 || Philadelphia || 4–1 || Vegas || || Neuvirth || 18,220 || 28–19–9 || 65 || 
|- style="background:#ffc;"
| 57 || February 13 || New Jersey || 5–4 || Philadelphia || SO || Neuvirth || 19,312 || 28–19–10 || 66 || 
|- style="background:#cfc;"
| 58 || February 16 || Philadelphia || 2–1 || Columbus || OT || Neuvirth || 17,364 || 29–19–10 || 68 || 
|- style="background:#cfc;"
| 59 || February 18 || Philadelphia || 7–4 || NY Rangers || || Lyon || 18,006 || 30–19–10 || 70 || 
|- style="background:#cfc;"
| 60 || February 20 || Montreal || 2–3 || Philadelphia || OT || Lyon || 19,336 || 31–19–10 || 72 || 
|- style="background:#cfc;"
| 61 || February 22 || Columbus || 1–2 || Philadelphia || || Mrazek || 19,727 || 32–19–10 || 74 || 
|- style="background:#cfc;"
| 62 || February 24 || Philadelphia || 5–3 || Ottawa || || Mrazek || 16,128 || 33–19–10 || 76 || 
|- style="background:#cfc;"
| 63 || February 26 || Philadelphia || 1–0 || Montreal || SO || Mrazek || 21,302 || 34–19–10 || 78 || 
|-

|- style="background:#fcc;"
| 64 || March 1 || Carolina || 4–1 || Philadelphia || || Mrazek || 19,245 || 34–20–10 || 78 || 
|- style="background:#ffc;"
| 65 || March 3 || Philadelphia || 6–7 || Tampa Bay || SO || Mrazek || 19,092 || 34–20–11 || 79 || 
|- style="background:#fcc;"
| 66 || March 4 || Philadelphia || 1–4 || Florida || || Mrazek || 14,428 || 34–21–11 || 79 || 
|- style="background:#fcc;"
| 67 || March 7 || Pittsburgh || 5–2 || Philadelphia || || Mrazek || 19,624 || 34–22–11 || 79 || 
|- style="background:#fcc;"
| 68 || March 8 || Philadelphia || 2–3 || Boston || || Lyon || 17,565 || 34–23–11 || 79 || 
|- style="background:#cfc;"
| 69 || March 10 || Winnipeg || 1–2 || Philadelphia || || Mrazek || 19,929 || 35–23–11 || 81 || 
|- style="background:#fcc;"
| 70 || March 12 || Vegas || 3–2 || Philadelphia || || Mrazek || 19,723 || 35–24–11 || 81 || 
|- style="background:#fcc;"
| 71 || March 15 || Columbus || 5–3 || Philadelphia || || Mrazek || 19,354 || 35–25–11 || 81 || 
|- style="background:#cfc;"
| 72 || March 17 || Philadelphia || 4–2 || Carolina || || Lyon || 14,805 || 36–25–11 || 83 || 
|- style="background:#cfc;"
| 73 || March 18 || Washington || 3–6 || Philadelphia || || Mrazek || 19,687 || 37–25–11 || 85 || 
|- style="background:#ffc;"
| 74 || March 20 || Philadelphia || 4–5 || Detroit || SO || Lyon || 19,515 || 37–25–12 || 86 || 
|- style="background:#cfc;"
| 75 || March 22 || NY Rangers || 3–4 || Philadelphia || || Lyon || 19,584 || 38–25–12 || 88 || 
|- style="background:#ffc;"
| 76 || March 25 || Philadelphia || 4–5 || Pittsburgh || OT || Mrazek || 18,655 || 38–25–13 || 89 || 
|- style="background:#ffc;"
| 77 || March 27 || Philadelphia || 2–3 || Dallas || OT || Mrazek || 17,247 || 38–25–14 || 90 || 
|- style="background:#cfc;"
| 78 || March 28 || Philadelphia || 2–1 || Colorado || || Neuvirth || 16,320 || 39–25–14 || 92 || 
|-

|- style="background:#cfc;"
| 79 || April 1 || Boston || 3–4 || Philadelphia || OT || Mrazek || 19,904 || 40–25–14 || 94 || 
|- style="background:#fcc;"
| 80 || April 3 || Philadelphia || 4–5 || NY Islanders || || Mrazek || 11,951 || 40–26–14 || 94 || 
|- style="background:#cfc;"
| 81 || April 5 || Carolina || 3–4 || Philadelphia || || Elliott || 20,001 || 41–26–14 || 96 || 
|- style="background:#cfc;"
| 82 || April 7 || NY Rangers || 0–5 || Philadelphia || || Elliott || 20,028 || 42–26–14 || 98 || 
|-

|-
| Legend:

Playoffs

|- style="background:#fcc;"
| 1 || April 11 || Philadelphia || 0–7 || Pittsburgh ||  || Elliott || 18,556 || 0–1 || 
|- style="background:#cfc;"
| 2 || April 13 || Philadelphia || 5–1 || Pittsburgh ||  || Elliott || 18,648 || 1–1 || 
|- style="background:#fcc;"
| 3 || April 15 || Pittsburgh || 5–1 || Philadelphia ||  || Elliott || 19,955 || 1–2 || 
|- style="background:#fcc;"
| 4 || April 18 || Pittsburgh || 5–0 || Philadelphia ||  || Elliott || 19,644 || 1–3 || 
|- style="background:#cfc;"
| 5 || April 20 || Philadelphia || 4–2 || Pittsburgh ||  || Neuvirth || 18,632 || 2–3 || 
|- style="background:#fcc;"
| 6 || April 22 || Pittsburgh || 8–5 || Philadelphia ||  || Neuvirth || 19,861 || 2–4 || 
|-

|-
| Legend:

Player statistics

Scoring
 Position abbreviations: C = Center; D = Defense; G = Goaltender; LW = Left Wing; RW = Right Wing
  = Joined team via a transaction (e.g., trade, waivers, signing) during the season. Stats reflect time with the Flyers only.
  = Left team via a transaction (e.g., trade, waivers, release) during the season. Stats reflect time with the Flyers only.

Goaltending

Awards and records

Awards

Records

Among the team records set during the 2017–18 season was Michael Raffl and Claude Giroux combining to score the fastest two goals in team history, scoring six seconds apart during the season finale on April 7. Excluding the shortened 2019–20 and 2020–21 seasons, the Flyers 679 penalty minutes on the season is an all-time franchise low. Giroux’s –10 plus/minus rating during the playoffs is a franchise worst.

Milestones

Suspensions and fines

Transactions
The Flyers were involved in the following transactions from June 12, 2017, the day after the deciding game of the 2017 Stanley Cup Finals, through June 7, 2018, the day of the deciding game of the 2018 Stanley Cup Finals.

Trades

Players acquired

Players lost

Signings

Draft picks

Below are the Philadelphia Flyers' selections at the 2017 NHL Entry Draft, held on June 23–24, 2017 at the United Center in Chicago, Illinois.

Notes

References
General
 
 
 
Specific

Philadelphia Flyers seasons
Philadelphia
Philadelphia
Philadelphia